The ashy-bellied white-eye (Zosterops citrinella) is a species of bird in the family Zosteropidae found in the Lesser Sunda Islands and northern Cape York Peninsula. It is sometimes called the pale white-eye or pale-bellied white-eye, but should not be confused with the pale-bellied white-eye (Zosterops consobrinorum).

Its natural habitats are subtropical or tropical moist lowland forest and subtropical or tropical mangrove forest.

References

ashy-bellied white-eye
Birds of the Lesser Sunda Islands
Birds of Cape York Peninsula
ashy-bellied white-eye
ashy-bellied white-eye
Taxonomy articles created by Polbot